Daniel Noonan (11 May 1873 – 30 May 1910) was an Australian cricketer. He played five first-class cricket matches for Victoria between 1901 and 1903.

See also
 List of Victoria first-class cricketers

References

External links
 

1873 births
1910 deaths
Australian cricketers
Victoria cricketers
Cricketers from Melbourne